Aspidoscelis ceralbensis, the Cerralvo Island whiptail, is a species of teiid lizard endemic to Jacques Cousteau Island in Mexico.

References

ceralbensis
Reptiles described in 1921
Taxa named by John Van Denburgh
Taxa named by Joseph Richard Slevin
Reptiles of Mexico